SM UB-103 was a German Type UB III submarine or U-boat in the German Imperial Navy during World War I. She was commissioned on 18 December 1917 as SM UB-103.

UB-103 was sunk in the English Channel by British warships and SSZ 1, a SSZ class blimp. All hands were lost.

Construction

She was built by Blohm & Voss of Hamburg and, after just under a year of construction, launched at Hamburg on 7 July 1917. UB-103 was commissioned later the same year, under the command of KptLt Paul Hundius. Like all Type UB III submarines, UB-103 carried 10 torpedoes and was armed with a  deck gun. UB-103 had a displacement of  while surfaced and  when submerged. Her engines enabled her to travel at  when surfaced and  when submerged.

Summary of raiding history

References

Notes

Citations

Bibliography 

 

German Type UB III submarines
World War I submarines of Germany
U-boats commissioned in 1917
1917 ships
Ships built in Hamburg
U-boats sunk in 1918
U-boats sunk by British aircraft
U-boats sunk by British warships
World War I shipwrecks in the English Channel
Ships lost with all hands